Trochidrobia smithi  is a species of very small freshwater snail, an aquatic gastropod mollusk in the family Tateidae. This species is endemic to Australia.

References 

Gastropods of Australia
Trochidrobia
Vulnerable fauna of Australia
Gastropods described in 1989
Taxonomy articles created by Polbot